Dayao County (Chuxiong Yi script: , IPA：) is a county of north-central Yunnan province, People's Republic of China, under the administration of Chuxiong Yi Autonomous Prefecture.

Administrative divisions
Dayao County has 8 towns, 3 townships and 1 ethnic township. 
8 towns

3 townships
 Tanhua
 Tiesuo
 Santai
1 ethnic township
 Wanbi Dai and Lisu

Ethnic groups
The Dayao County Gazetteer (1999:780) lists the following Yi subgroups.

Luoluopu 罗罗濮 dialect (spoken in the northwest hill districts)
Luoluopu 罗罗濮
Laluobo 腊罗拨
Popei 婆胚
Lipu 俚濮 dialect: (spoken in the Qingling River 蜻蛉河 and Yipao River 一泡江 watersheds)
Lipu 俚濮
Machipu 骂池濮
Gesupu 格苏濮

Climate

References

External links
Dayao County Official Website

County-level divisions of Chuxiong Prefecture